Sir William Augustus Curzon Barrington  (28 January 1842 – 23 February 1922) was a British diplomat.

Background
Born at Beckett Hall in Berkshire, he was the third son of William Barrington, 6th Viscount Barrington and his wife Jane Elizabeth, fourth daughter of Thomas Liddell, 1st Baron Ravensworth. His older brothers were George Barrington, 7th Viscount Barrington and Percy Barrington, 8th Viscount Barrington. Having been previously in private schools in Cheam and in Woolwich, Barrington received his further education in Germany, in schools at Mannheim and at Bonn.

Diplomatic career
Barrington joined the Diplomatic Service in 1860. After four years he was promoted to a 3rd secretary and in 1870 to a 2nd secretary. He was sent as secretary of legation to Buenos Aires in 1883 and was transferred to Budapest as consul-general two years later.

Barrington arrived as secretary of embassy in Madrid in 1888 and exchanged to Vienna after four years. In 1896, he became Envoy Extraordinary Minister Plenipotentiary to the Argentine Republic and simultaneously to the Republic of Paraguay. He was appointed a Knight Commander of the Order of St Michael and St George (KCMG) in the New Year Honours list 1901, and was knighted and invested as such by King Edward VII in person in February 1901.
In March 1902 he was appointed Envoy Extraordinary and Minister Plenipotentiary to the King of Sweden and Norway, but he did not take up the position until that Autumn; after he was received by King Edward VII in early September, he arrived in Stockholm the following month. He served there until 1904.

Later life
He was unmarried and died in 1922.

Styles and Honours

Styles
1842-1900: The Honourable William Barrington
1901-1922: The Honourable Sir William Barrington, KCMG

Honours
KCMG : Knight Commander of the Most Distinguished Order of St Michael and St George - 1 January 1901 - New Year Honours list

References

External links

1842 births
1922 deaths
Knights Commander of the Order of St Michael and St George
Younger sons of viscounts
Ambassadors of the United Kingdom to Sweden
Ambassadors of the United Kingdom to Argentina
Ambassadors of the United Kingdom to Paraguay